Microclytus compressicollis is a species of longhorn beetle in the Cerambycinae subfamily. It was described by Laporte and Gory in 1835. It is known from northeastern North America.

References

Anaglyptini
Beetles described in 1835